() or Portuguese stew is a type of cozido, traditional Portuguese boiled meal. Numerous regional variations exist throughout Portugal, and the dish is considered part of the Portuguese heritage, as well as one of the national dishes of Portugal.

Preparation and ingredients
Cozido à Portuguesa is prepared with a multitude of vegetables (cabbages, beans, potatoes, carrots, turnips, rice), meat (chicken, pork ribs, bacon, pork ear and trotters, various parts of beef), and smoked sausages (chouriço, farinheira, morcela), among others. In the São Miguel Island, Azores, a local version of the Cozido à Portuguesa is cooked underground with heat and steam coming from the volcanic phenomena in the area.

See also 

 Bosnian Pot
 Cocido lebaniego
 Cocido montañés
 Irish stew
 Pot-au-feu
 Istrian stew
 List of stews

References 

National dishes
Portuguese stews
Sausage dishes